Verkhnyaya Bikberda (Ürge Bikbirźe) is a rural locality (a village) in Bikbausky Selsoviet, Zianchurinsky District, Bashkortostan, Russia. The population was 191 as of 2010. There are 4 streets.

Geography 
Verkhnyaya Bikberda is located 25 km northeast of Isyangulovo (the district's administrative centre) by road. Nizhnyaya Bikberda is the nearest rural locality.

References 

Rural localities in Zianchurinsky District